Saeed Hizam (Arabic:سعيد حزام) (born 20 March 1998) is an Emirati footballer. He currently plays as a defender .

External links

References

Emirati footballers
1998 births
Living people
Al Jazira Club players
UAE Pro League players
Association football defenders